Robert Hellen (born 1725, died 1793 in Donnybrook, Dublin) was an Irish politician, Solicitor-General, and judge of the Court of Common Pleas (Ireland).

Early life 
He was born at Whitehaven, Cumberland, son of Robert Hellen senior. His family moved to Dublin where he was educated at the University of Dublin, taking his degree of Bachelor of Arts in 1746 and Bachelor of Laws in 1749. He entered Middle Temple in 1749 and was called to the Irish bar in 1755. He became King's Counsel in 1774.

Career
He became the Member of Parliament for Bannow in 1768 and Fethard (County Wexford) in 1776. He was appointed as Solicitor-General in 1777, and a judge of the Court of Common Pleas in 1779.

Family 
He married Dorothea Daniel of Dublin in 1761; Dorothea was wealthy but it may have been a love marriage since she was also noted for beauty and charm. They had four daughters.

Character 
When young he was described rather sentimentally as "a youth of fair fame and gentle endowments". In later life he was noted for his literary tastes: he enjoyed the company of poets and writers like Charlotte Brooke, and built up an impressive library and picture collection. He was considered a poor politician, but a learned judge.

References

1725 births
1793 deaths
Irish MPs 1769–1776
Irish MPs 1776–1783
Members of the Parliament of Ireland (pre-1801) for County Wexford constituencies
Solicitors-General for Ireland
People from Whitehaven
Justices of the Irish Common Pleas